The Rede Aleluia (Hallelujah Network) is 64 affiliated Brazilian radio stations network owned/rented by the UCKG (Universal Church of the Kingdom of God) in 22 of the 27 states, that cover 75% of the Brazilian territory mostly in southeastern region, and also there is an internet radio version on its site. The radio broadcasts the programming of TV Universal since 2011.

History

Rede Aleluia was created in 1995 with 19 affiliated radio stations retransmitting the central signal via satellite from the radio 105 FM in Rio de Janeiro. Since the second half of 2002 the central transmission has been from the radio 99.3 FM in São Paulo.

Programming

The basic Rede Aleluia programming is composed of gospel national and international songs and instrumental melodies specially from Line Records and New Music record label, news and guidelines every two hours and local programming of the UCKG.

Stations
This is a list of the radio stations by cities, generally the radio stations also have signal in neighbor cities.

Central-west

Distrito Federal
Brasília - 99.3 FM
Goiás
Anápolis - 100 FM
Mato Grosso
Cuiabá 100.9 FM
Mato Grosso do Sul
Campo Grande - 102.7 FM

North

Amazonas
Manaus - 95.1 fM
Pará
Belém - 98 FM
Rondônia
Porto Velho - 96.9 FM

Northeast

Bahia
Ilhéus - 97.9 FM
Itabuna - 96.9 FM
Salvador - 96 FM
Ceará
Fortaleza - 99.9 FM
Maranhão
São Luís - 105.5 FM
Paraíba
João Pessoa - 99.7 FM

Pernambuco
Garanhuns - 550 AM
Recife - 91.9 FM
Piauí
Teresina - 94.1 FM
Rio Grande do Norte
Natal - 102.9 FM
Sergipe
Aracaju - 98.1 FM

South

Paraná
Curitiba - 88.5 FM
Londrina - 105.5 FM

Rio Grande do Sul
Caxias do Sul - 93.5 FM
Pelotas - 93.3 FM
Porto Alegre - 100.5 FM
Santa Catarina
Florianópolis - 99.3 FM

Southeast

Espírito Santo
Vitória - 90.1 FM
Minas Gerais
Belo Horizonte - 90.7 FM
Juiz de Fora - 93.5 FM
Poços de Caldas - 96.7 FM
Uberaba - 103.7 FM
Uberlândia - 99.9 FM
Rio de Janeiro
Angra dos Reis - 101 FM
Cabo Frio - 102 FM
Campos dos Goytacazes - 89 FM
Macaé - 103 FM
Rio de Janeiro - 105 FM
Volta Redonda - 101.5 FM
São Paulo
Araçatuba - 104.3 FM
Bauru - 103.7 FM
Botucatu - 93.1 FM
Campinas - 100.3 FM
Catanduva - 94.9 FM
Franca - 98.3 FM
Guarujá/Santos - 94.3 FM
Jaú - 98.5 FM
Limeira - 95.1 FM
Lins - 103.1 FM
Marília - 92.9 FM
Piracicaba - 97.1 FM
Registro - 750 AM
Ribeirão Preto - 103.5 FM
São Carlos - 96.9 FM
São José do Rio Preto - 97.1 FM
São José dos Campos - 99.7 FM
Sorocaba - 99.7 FM
Taubaté - 106.5 FM
Vinhedo/Jundiaí - 94.1 FM
Votuporanga - 99 FM

See also

Universal Church of the Kingdom of God
Line Records

External links
official website  page about the history 
Central-West
North
Northeast
South
Southeast

Brazilian radio networks
Universal Church of the Kingdom of God